Aneta Louise Corsaut (November 3, 1933November 6, 1995) was an American actress and writer. She is best known for playing Helen Crump on The Andy Griffith Show (1963–1968), Judge Cynthia Justin on Matlock (1991–1992), and Jane in The Blob (1958).

Early life and career
Born in Hutchinson, Kansas, Corsaut was the daughter of Jesse Harrison and Opal J. (née Swarens) Corsaut. She majored in drama at Northwestern University and studied acting with Lee Strasberg. During her junior year, Corsaut dropped out to pursue a career in acting, although during the run of The Andy Griffith Show, Corsaut took courses at UCLA with plans to earn her degree.

She began her acting career in New York City in the mid-1950s. In 1958, Corsaut and Steve McQueen made their film debuts in the independent cult horror film The Blob. On television, in 1961–1962, she portrayed Irma Howell on the CBS sitcom Mrs. G. Goes to College. 

Corsaut first appeared on the long-running Griffith show in 1963 as schoolteacher Helen Crump, who later became the Mayberry sheriff's wife on the first episode of the spinoff Mayberry R.F.D. In 1965 she was also cast as Kathy McLennan, the young widow of a rancher, in the episode "Paid in Full" on the syndicated Western anthology series Death Valley Days. Corsaut later had a continuing role as policeman Bumper Morgan's pawn-shop-owner friend on the 1975–1976 series The Blue Knight. In the series Adam-12, Corsaut portrayed Officer Pete Malloy's girlfriend Judy. She had a supporting role too as Head Nurse Bradley in the 1980s sitcom House Calls, and she appeared in several episodes of Matlock with star Andy Griffith. In addition, Corsaut played the role of nurse Jesse Brewer in 1977 on the long-running ABC soap opera General Hospital when long-time portrayer Emily McLaughlin was too ill to work.

She returned to the role of Helen Crump in the reunion shows Return to Mayberry in 1986 and The Andy Griffith Show Reunion in 1993.

As a writer, she coauthored The Mystery Reader's Quiz Book.

Personal life and death
Corsaut never married nor had children. 

On November 6, 1995, Corsaut died of cancer in Los Angeles, California. A Catholic, she was interred at Valhalla Memorial Park Cemetery in nearby North Hollywood.

Filmography

Film

Television

References

External links

1933 births
1995 deaths
20th-century American actresses
Actresses from Kansas
American film actresses
American soap opera actresses
American television actresses
Burials at Valhalla Memorial Park Cemetery
Deaths from cancer in California
Northwestern University School of Communication alumni
People from Hutchinson, Kansas
University of California, Los Angeles alumni
Writers from Kansas
20th-century American women writers
20th-century American writers
California Democrats
Kansas Democrats
American Roman Catholics
People from Studio City, Los Angeles